Shahrokhabad may refer to:
 Shahrokhabad, Fahraj, Kerman Province
 Shahrokhabad, Kerman, Kerman Province
 Shahrokhabad, Zarand, Kerman Province
 Shahrokhabad, Kermanshah
 Shahrokhabad, Razavi Khorasan